The Old Angel Inn is a Grade II listed public house in the Lace Market, Nottingham.

History

A public house called the Old Angel has existed in the Lace Market area of Nottingham since around 1600. Until the middle of the 19th century, a half-timbered house also known as The Old Angel, existed at the junction of High Pavement and St Mary’s Gate.

Originally 2 houses, the current public house building dates from around 1800. In 1878, the landlord W Robinson employed Lawrence Bright to make alterations, and 5 years later, in 1883, the landlord J Robinson made further alterations under the architect H Walker.

In 1911, Horace Shears, cellarman, pleaded guilty to stealing five bottles of whisky, two bottles of gin, one bottle of sherry, and some towels and handkerchiefs to the value of £3. He was sent to prison for 2 months.

In the 1980s the pub developed a reputation as a rock and roll venue, with the old chapel on the 1st floor converted into a performance area. Many up and coming bands played here including Oasis, Kasabian and the Arctic Monkeys.

In 2016 it reinvented itself as an organic gastro pub.

References

Grade II listed buildings in Nottinghamshire
Pubs in Nottingham